Ratko Nikolić (born 11 July 1977) is a former Serbian footballer.

References

1977 births
Footballers from Belgrade
Living people
Serbian footballers
FK Radnički Obrenovac players
FK Zvezdara players
FK Milicionar players
FC Anzhi Makhachkala players
Russian Premier League players
Serbian expatriate footballers
Expatriate footballers in Russia
FK Radnički Beograd players
Association football midfielders